Mark T. Johnston (born November 15, 1970, in Lebanon, Kentucky) is a retired jockey in thoroughbred horse racing who was voted the 1990 Eclipse Award for Outstanding Apprentice Jockey in the United States.  

Riding from 1989 through 2004, Mark Johnston won 3085 races.

References

1970 births
living people
American jockeys
Eclipse Award winners
Sportspeople from Kentucky